Gestern und heute (English: Yesterday and Today) is a 1938 German Nazi propaganda short film directed by Hans Steinhoff and Ben Keim.

Plot summary
The documentary film contrasts Germany in the days before Adolf Hitler became chancellor with the current (late 1930s) day Germany and how it has improved.  The film was widely popularized by German propagandist Ben Keim by order of Josef Goebbels.

Soundtrack 
Music in the film was composed by German-Austrian Peter Kreuder.

See also 
 Wort und Tat

External links

References 

1938 documentary films
1938 films
Films of Nazi Germany
German short documentary films
1930s German-language films
German black-and-white films
Black-and-white documentary films
Films directed by Hans Steinhoff
1930s German films